Edens Landing is a suburb in the City of Logan, Queensland, Australia.

History
The current suburb of Edens Landing is a recent settlement developed by Leighton Holdings. It was originally called Holmview Heights. There is a street named after the original developers, Leighton Drive. Edens Landing was established in 1984-5 when Henry Edens, a man involved in the timber industry, allowed Leighton Holdings to clear the land, this was the start of many business dealings that lead to Edens acquiring the land and beginning the residential settlement.

Edens Landing State School opened on 28 January 1997.

Demographics
The median age of the Edens Landing population was 33 years, 5 years below the national median of 38, with 69.8% of people living in Edens Landing born in Australia. The other top responses for country of birth were New Zealand 8.7%, England 4.0%, Afghanistan 1.2%, Philippines 1.0%, South Africa 0.6%. 84.4% of people spoke only English at home; the next most common languages were 0.9% Samoan, 0.8% Dari, 0.6% Hazaraghi, 0.6% Filipino, 0.5% Spanish.

Education
Edens Landing State School is a government primary (Prep-6) school for boys and girls at Jamie Nicolson Avenue. In 2017, the school had an enrolment of 743 students with 56 teachers (47 full-time equivalent) and 31 non-teaching staff (19 full-time equivalent). It includes a special education program. The school has a large oval for school sporting events as well as tennis, netball and basketball courts,  with a small field located in the upper region of the school.

Sport
Located off Loane Drive is Edens Landing's only sporting establishment. A Rugby League club, The Edens Landing Dragons formed in 1993 with one open side playing in the Metropolitan Rugby League Competition. In 1994, the opens coach who had experience in establishing another Logan Rugby League Club was asked by Leighton Holdings whether a junior club would be feasible and a proposal was put to Logan Districts Juniors to join their competition in 1995 with junior sides. The club operated on Leighton fields. The club offered teams from under 7's to Opens but has since folded after around eleven seasons. It formally participated in a number of competitions in Brisbane.

Transport
Edens Landing is serviced by the Logan City bus company with bus 562 making stops along the main street of Castile Crescent.  This bus service connects at the Loganholme bus station and interchange (located adjacent to the Logan Hyperdome shopping centre) with a variety of bus services to the Brisbane CBD.  Edens Landing also has a railway station that is part of the Beenleigh railway line.

Health
Edens Landing has its own medical centre and pharmacy located on Castile Crescent in the Edens Landing shop complex.

Shopping
Edens Landing has a number of shops most of which are located on a small complex near leighton fields on Castile Crescent, these include, Rainbow corner child care centre, medical centre, spa general shop, pharmacy, fish & chip shop,  bakery, hairdresser and an Sushi take-out store. Other shops located in Edens Landing is a real estate agent located on Leighton Drive.

Religion
Currently Edens Landing has only one religious service, a Seventh-day Adventist Church.

References

External links

 

Suburbs of Logan City